Spectamen tryphenense is a species of sea snail, a marine gastropod mollusk in the family Solariellidae. This marine species is endemic to New Zealand and occurs off the Great Barrier Island

Distribution
This marine species is endemic to New Zealand.

References

 Powell, A.W.B. 1979: New Zealand Mollusca: Marine, Land and Freshwater Shells. Collins, Auckland 500p 
 Marshall, B.A. 1999: A revision of the Recent Solariellinae (Gastropoda: Trochoidea) of the New Zealand region. The Nautilus 113: 4-42

External links
 To World Register of Marine Species
 Powell, A. W. B. (1930). New species of New Zealand Mollusca from shallow-water dredgings. Part 1. Transactions and Proceedings of the New Zealand Institute. 60: 532-543
 Williams S.T., Kano Y., Warén A. & Herbert D.G. (2020). Marrying molecules and morphology: first steps towards a reevaluation of solariellid genera (Gastropoda: Trochoidea) in the light of molecular phylogenetic studies. Journal of Molluscan Studies. 86(1): 1–26

tryphenense
Gastropods of New Zealand
Gastropods described in 1930